During the original 1975-1977 run of Space: 1999, the science-fiction series generated a number of media tie-ins, including novelisations, original novels, comic books and audio dramas. Due to the series' ongoing cult following, new tie-ins continue to be released to this day.

Some critics credit Space: 1999 with bridging the gap between Star Trek and Star Wars.

Books

1970s novels and novelisations
In the mid-1970s, a number of books were published by both American (Pocket Books) and British (Futura) publishers, consisting primarily of novelisations of Space: 1999 episodes. These releases, mainly paperback, were supplemented by 16-page photo sections (Year One and Two in the United States, Year Two only in the United Kingdom), which comprised black-and-white stills from the episodes. Original novels, without photo section, also formed a part of the series. Many of the books were also translated for release in overseas markets, such as Germany, Turkey and Japan.

English-language releases

Year One
Breakaway by E.C. Tubb. Novelisation of "Breakaway", "Matter of Life and Death", "Ring Around The Moon" and "Black Sun". Using the scripted stories and plot points as a springboard, Tubb weaves the four installments into one continuous (and still-recognisable) narrative. (Fans expecting a word-by-word adaptation will be disappointed.) Characterisation is strong, especially among the three leads: Tubb identifies their personal loneliness and reasons for wanting to retreat from Earth to the "safety" of the Moon. Tubb also injects a great deal of science into the narrative, attempting to explain many of the inexplicable events in the language of 1970s scientific knowledge. He depicts the mental adjustment of the Alphans to a hazardous existence in deep space, with several personnel reportedly going mad or committing suicide, and their preparations to survive the voyage by adapting Moonbase Alpha's physical facilities. Significant changes include: (1) Commissioner Simmonds is a casualty of the "breakaway" – a bad fall and the subsequent crushing G-forces leave him dead from a severe skull fracture. (2) Meta and Terra Nova are made the same planet, lending credence to Commander John Koenig's optimism at the end of "Breakaway" that Meta holds hope for the future. (3) Helena Russell's experience of the destruction of Terra Nova and the reconnaissance party and its subsequent magical reversal is given the possible explanation of being a bad "trip" induced by hallucinogenic compounds in the native fruit that she samples. (4) Triton is not another planet light years from Earth, but the moon of Neptune gone missing in this story. (5) Professor Victor Bergman creates the anti-gravity force field in "Ring Around The Moon" to outwit the Tritonians, based on information obtained from the explosions at Disposal Areas One and Two, then adapts it to shield Alpha for the "Black Sun" segment. (6) The surviving Eagle Transporter cannot escape the gravitational pull of the black sun, so Carter opts to follow the Moon. (7) David Kano is present in the "Breakaway" portion of the novel, while no mention is made of Benjamin Ouma.
Moon Odyssey by John Rankine. Novelisation of "Alpha Child", "The Last Sunset", "Voyager's Return" and "Another Time, Another Place". Rankine employs a much more conservative approach to the novel, with a faithful script-to-prose adaption of the four episode. Any linking of the four segments is minimal and does not alter events. Thankfully, no explanations are offered for the mysterious and mind-blowing events that the Alphans experience. Rankine's style is clean and fast-paced and, while maintaining character integrity, portrays the regulars as more down-to-earth, regular people in contrast to Tubb's über-intelligent, more tension-ridden interpretation. Changes from established episodes are few and usually because they were present in the final shooting scripts and reflective of last-minute alterations: (1) Sue Crawford was originally named Cynthia Crawford. (2) Jarak and Rena's pursuers from home appeared in a fleet of six ships identical to theirs rather than one large warship. (3) The conclusion of the "biological clock" dialogue between Sandra Benes and Paul Morrow in "The Last Sunset" excised from the final print is restored (Sandra: "Do you know what sound I miss most in the silence of space?" Paul: "Birdsong?" And now, before the kiss, Sandra: "The sound of children".)
The Space Guardians by Brian Ball. Novelisation of "Missing Link", "Force of Life" and "Guardian of Piri". This novel's style is a hybrid of the first two; a continuous interlinking novel that can veer from the on-screen narrative, but with large portions adapted verbatim. Ball is much more liberal with the Alphans and their portrayals, while consistent within the novel, do not match up with the characterisations created on-screen. The protagonist is Commander Koenig, who is put through a tortured learning curve in these three segments. Alpha is depicted as a very realistic and interactive community. Changes are made both for creative and practical reasons: (1) The reconnaissance mission in "Missing Link" was not to explore the Cryton solar system, but searching for a detected mineral deposit on the Moon's surface. (This was also depicted in the final shooting script.) (2) Raan's faux-Bergman deceives Koenig for an extended time, revealing the sensor reading of the mineral deposit was actually that of a buried alien spacecraft boasting an interstellar propulsion system. During a visit to the excavated craft, he tries to tempt Koenig into abandoning the Alphans and using the ship to get the two of them home. (3) Koenig's love for Vana borders on epic and persists throughout the novel. In the "Force of Life" chapters, memories of Vana produce a fugue-like grief, causing him to withdraw from the normal routine and giving him crippling migraines. In "Guardian of Piri", he has come to terms with this, but its persisting memory gives Koenig the strength of will to resist the influence of the Guardian. (4) After Zenno, the Moon drifts out of the galaxy, encountering the heat-absorbing life force and the isolated Pirian solar system in the intergalactic void. (5) Piri alternates in appearance between the reality of a desert wasteland and the Guardian's vision of a lush paradise garden.
Collision Course by E.C. Tubb. Novelisation of "Collision Course", "The Full Circle", "End of Eternity" and "Death's Other Dominion". Tubb's second effort is much the same as his Breakaway.  All four tales are blended into a single narrative, with the scientific explanations added for Operation Shockwave, the sudden appearance and ultimate fate of Atheria, the Rethan personal time warp and the means of Balor's immortality. He also debunks the normal complaint of critics of Space: 1999 by having Atheria, Retha, the Progron asteroid and Ultima Thule present in the same solar system. The stories bear a closer resemblance to their respective episodes with more on-screen action and dialogue represented. An interesting passage giving insight into the daily life on Alpha is added: Koenig converses with the head of nutrition in a mess hall, mentioning the poor flavour of the morning meal. The subordinate explains that an algae strain was contaminated, but used regardless to create the simulated butter, eggs and coffee. The alternative was to scrap the lot and provide survival rations. Changes made include: (1) Retha being revealed from behind Atheria after its disappearance and proposed as a possible "parting gift" from Arra. (2) The Alphans not attempting to destroy Balor's asteroid at the close of the story. Its power of indestructibility had been demonstrated at the top of this segment by an almost organic re-growth potential, rather than a magical post-destructive reappearance. (3) Captain Alan Carter being attacked by the hostile wildlife of Ultima Thule just as he locates the Eagle during the white-out.
Lunar Attack by John Rankine. Novelisation of "War Games", "The Troubled Spirit", "The Last Enemy" and "Space Brain". Rankine's second outing is a solid novelisation in the same spirit as his first, and the four stories remain faithful to their script origins. His prose style remains brisk, but includes more descriptive passages (as if he had viewed these stories before getting down to writing). The attack theme is carried through all four stories, with three depicting assaults on Alpha from external forces and a fourth from within the mind of one of their own. Teleplay purists will note more than a few discrepancies as "The Last Enemy" and "Space Brain" were extensively re-worked after completion of the principal photography. Changes include: (1) The music programme in "The Troubled Spirit" is a string quartet led by Bergman. (2) In "The Last Enemy", Dione receives reports from a male Bethan regarding the status of the wandering Moon. (3) None of the action onboard Dione's battleship Satazius appears, as this was scripted and filmed after the fact as filler for this severely under-running episode. The whole "men v. women" idea is mostly lost without Dione's glamour-girl crew. (4) The ending of "The Last Enemy" is that of the unrevised shooting script. The sequence with the two planets both threatening Alpha with destruction over Koenig's provision of co-ordinates for Satazius does not occur, nor does his desperate gambit to dispose of Dione and company. Koenig simply transmits the co-ordinates of the Bethan gunship to Talos on Delta, who immediately sends a missile strike to destroy it. (5) In "Space Brain", the lost fight between Carter and Kelly excised from the final cut is restored where a Brain-controlled Kelly attempts to send the Eagle into the centre of the Brain. (6) The ending of "Space Brain" is that of the unrevised shooting script. Koenig has a last-minute epiphany: if the antibodies are intentionally allowed into the Alpha complex, they cannot crush it, and orders all airlocks opened. The Brain survives intact, gently deflecting the Moon from its collision course.
Astral Quest by John Rankine. Novelisation of "The Infernal Machine", "Mission of the Darians", "Dragon's Domain" and "The Testament of Arkadia". Rankine maintains his high-quality interpretation of the series with the last four stories of Year One, displaying a prose-style that is a bit more sophisticated than his previous outings. (However, he loses a bit of credibility when he has the elegant and refined Benes utter the expletive "Holy cow!" at the sight of Gwent.) He weaves the four segments together with a continuing story of Koenig and Bergman discussing the first steps of establishing a viable civilisation when they eventually settle on a planet. The quest theme is explored through Gwent's search for identity, the Darians' ambitions for a future, Jim Calder's quest for redemption and the culmination of the destiny that the unknown forces holds in store for the Alphans. Changes this time are few: (1) Morrow is present in "The Infernal Machine". (2) The mutants are referred to by the Darian survivor tribe as "Mutes". (3) The Tony Cellini and Monique Bouchere characters are known as "Jim Calder" and "Olga Vishenskya" as they were in the final shooting script.
Alien Seed by E.C. Tubb (original novel)
Android Planet by John Rankine (original novel)
Rogue Planet by E.C. Tubb (original novel)
Phoenix of Megaron by John Rankine (original novel - US only)
Earthfall by E.C. Tubb (original novel - UK only) – notable in that it concludes the Space: 1999 odyssey, and features the descendants of the Alphans returning to Earth.
"Earthbound" is the only Year One episode not included in this series of novelisations.

Year Two
Planets of Peril by Michael Butterworth. Novelisation of "The Metamorph", "The AB Chrysalis", "The Rules of Luton" and "New Adam, New Eve".  The new series receives a new style of writing. Butterworth has a complicated prose style, heavy with descriptive passages and character insights. The characters sometimes speak and behave melodramatically. Great licence is taken with the scripts and major changes are made in these stories to suit their assembly into one consistent plotline. Only some of this can be attributed to his being supplied with draft scripts. Butterworth acknowledges the never-mentioned backstory that the Alphans have relocated underground.  Major changes include: (1) The use of the character names Simon Hays, Mark Macinlock and Jameson (later revised to Tony Verdeschi, Alan Carter and Petrov) as they appeared in the final draft of "The Metamorph". In a schizophrenic attempt to accommodate different drafts of the script, Butterworth has Hays accompany Koenig to Psychon (and sometimes forgetting that he is there) while Verdeschi is left in command of Moonbase Alpha. After the events of "The Metamorph", Macinlock would take a "well-deserved rest" and Alan Carter becomes the main pilot. (2) The mineral that would send the Alphans to Psychon is named  (as it was also called in the final shooting script).  is described as a radioactive metal that had replaced plutonium as fuel for the nuclear reactors due to its significantly higher potency and harmless by-products. (3) In "The AB Chrysalis", the shockwaves threaten the Moon directly after the destruction of Psychon. Maya accompanies the reconnaissance party to their planet of origin, not as an official crew member, but at Helena's request to give the girl refugee "something to do" to keep her from grieving over her losses. (With Maya unfamiliar to the Alphans, Butterworth actually makes sense of the filler where Koenig and Carter marvel over her extraordinary ability of mental arithmetic.) (4) Verdeschi replaces Koenig on the Luton survey mission with Maya, in an attempt to force these characters together and accelerate their romance. (5) Maya becomes the newly appointed scientific officer with a desk in Command Centre in "New Adam, New Eve". (6) Benes and Yasko appear in Command Centre together on several occasions.
Mind-Breaks of Space by J. Jeff Jones and Michael Butterworth. Novelisation of "Brian the Brain", "The Mark of Archanon", "Catacombs of the Moon" and "One Moment of Humanity". Sources indicate Jones wrote the majority of the book. Brian the Brain's interference with Alpha's Main Computer would cause the reactors to use too much too quickly.  would be the cause of the mining operations seen in "The Mark of Archanon" and "Catacombs of the Moon". The surface explosions caused by the hydrogen heat-storm would split open a rill on the lunar surface and expose a large vein of the valuable mineral. Butterworth also has Maya's transformations feature more distinctively alien creatures rather than terrestrial animals, addressing the complaints of both Catherine Schell and the fans. Changes include: (1) Koenig's plan to break Brian's mind involves he, Helena and Maya confusing the Brain by each clamoring to provide it with maintenance, then Maya transforms into Captain Michael to send it over the edge. (This was from an earlier draft script). (2) Maya transforms into a bipedal headless bat creature to search for the fugitive Osgoods in the pitch-black catacombs. (3) The hydrogen heat-storm is a force of nature only and there is no speculation as to its possible sentience. (4) The first appearance of "Sahn" as a male Indian operative rather than Sandra Benes going by a new nickname.
The Space-Jackers by Michael Butterworth. Novelisation of "Seed of Destruction", "A Matter of Balance", "The Exiles" and "The Beta Cloud". Butterworth returns as solo author of this novel. The stories are more delineated and match their on-screen counterparts (except for "The Beta Cloud"). The hunt for  continues as Cantar and Zova exhaust Moonbase's supply using their matter transmitter jury-rigged from the life-support system and, by the end of the novel, it is stated that Alpha has only enough power for one more day. His use of imaginative alien forms for the Maya transformations continues with her selection to fight the Cloud robot: a two-headed, fire-breathing dragon beast with razor-like forearms. Changes include: (1) Botanist Shermeen's last name is "Goodwood" and he is only eighteen at the time, having been trapped on the runaway Moon as a teenager during an ill-timed holiday. (2) Hays makes another appearance the first half of "The Exiles" (the shooting script used his name till this point). He remains in Command Centre with Koenig when Verdeschi and Maya are dispatched to Life Support to check on Cantar and Zova's progress. He is not mentioned again. (3) The male Indian "Sahn" makes another appearance, substituting at the station normally occupied by Benes. (4) In "The Beta Cloud", major changes are made to the narrative (not the least of which is the disappearance of all the filler scenes added to this severely under-running episode). Maya is severely injured during her initial battle with the Cloud's robot and remains in Medical Centre for much of the story, and a recovering Carter joins Verseschi and Fraser in their attempts to repel the invader. Maya's epiphany about the robot's true nature is given to her by Ben Vincent with an off-hand remark: "If Tony and Alan can't stop that runaway robot, no one can." Maya then inexplicably escapes from the locked Medical Centre to join the three men for the final showdown at Life Support, sustained by stimulants and pain-killing drugs.  There is no happy ending as they realise that the aforementioned power dilemma will mean the end of Alpha. As an aside, Macinlock is mentioned as the ill-fated pilot of Eagle Six, effectively writing the character out of the series.
The Psychomorph by Michael Butterworth. Novelisation of "The Lambda Factor" and "The Bringers of Wonder, Part One" and "The Bringers of Wonder, Part Two". Butterworth's fourth outing presents a behind-the-scenes manipulator: a million-mile wide sentient space amoeba. The amoeba has existed for billions of years and sustains itself on the radiation of the stars it absorbs. Now senile and powerless, its once massive body shrunken and dying, it must receive a massive influx of radiation to survive. The arrival of the travelling Moon gives it its last chance and it attempts by any means to deceive the Alphans into causing a thermonuclear explosion to regenerate itself. The  crisis narrative from the end of The Space-Jackers is picked up with Alpha poised on the brink of oblivion. With only hours to go, mild-mannered mining engineer Carl Renton, under the influence of the amoeba's lambda waves, has his inner desire for success realised as he is given the courage to enter an unsafe tunnel and discovers a major  deposit. Only minor changes are made to the teleplays: (1) Sally Martin is another unfortunate teen trapped on the runaway Moon when visiting her favourite uncle at the age of fifteen. (2) Carl Renton and his bully (named Harry Garth) shoot craps rather than play their complicated electronic gambling device. (3) Carolyn Powell is influenced by the amoeba to order the meltdown of the Alpha nuclear reactors when she takes over Command Centre. (4) "Sahn" switches sex and is now portrayed as female due to appearance of fiancé, Peter Rockwell. (5) The jellyfish aliens are no longer the primary antagonists, but psychically synthesised pawns of the non-corporeal space amoeba. (6) Carter actually succeeds in inserting the nuclear fuel canister into the waste-dome core, but it becomes conveniently jammed part-way down the chute and will have to be removed at a later date.
The Time Fighters by Michael Butterworth. Novelisation of "Space Warp", "Dorzak", "Devil's Planet" and "The Seance Spectre". Major plot adjustments abound in this novel. The most noticeable alteration is the blending of Devil's Planet with "The Seance Spectre", with both stories occurring simultaneously and replacing Koenig with Verdeschi in the latter story. Butterworth continues his use of very alien creatures in "Space Warp" with the first rampaging Maya monster described as a ten-foot-high, iridescent-scaled centaur-like being. Changes made include: (1) Maya's illness is a normal Psychon condition caused by a periodic imbalance of their super-intelligent minds. (2) The Croton spaceship is damaged after it, too, traverses the space warp, causing Sahala to seek help on Alpha. (3) Koenig's absence from "Dorzak" on is explained as a long-range reconnaissance mission to the solar system the Moon is approaching. Among its numerous members are the planet Ellna and its habitable moon Entra and the proto-planet Tora, with which the Moon will collide on its present trajectory. It is suggested that the local fabric of the universe was disturbed by the Moon's passage through the space warp and the collision with Tora is the ultimate result of this bad karma. (4) Koenig's crash on Entra goes unnoticed by the senior staff as this is the moment that Sandor (as Greg Sanderson was originally known in the script) and his many mutineers (more than three) choose to storm Command Centre and brutalise the staff into submission. No rescue Eagle is dispatched and Koenig is presumed missing during the collision crisis. (5) Sandor and his cronies are depicted as a bunch of malcontents rather than suffering from a psychological condition. They are no longer exterior workers, but ordinary Alphans. (6) Verdeschi is in command of Alpha during the Tora incident. He orders the detonation of the nuclear waste site and the evacuation of Alpha, personally performs the procedure to blow up the atomic waste and dispatches the maniacal Sandor before Koenig is rescued from Ellna.
The Edge of the Infinite by Michael Butterworth. Novelisation of "All That Glisters", "Journey to Where", "The Dorcons" and "The Immunity Syndrome". The final novel in the series. Butterworth adds an ominous interlinking plotline: the Moon is approaching the edge of the galaxy it is presently travelling across and the Alphans are desperately gathering and hoarding supplies to survive the journey through the intergalactic void for as long as possible. Helena's opening status report gives the date as 25 December 2005. Changes to established plotlines include: (1) The initial "neutrone" transmission from Texas City is received on Alpha while Koenig and company are away battling the sentient rocks in the All That Glisters segment ("neutrone" is the term used in an earlier draft of the "Journey to Where" script). (2) The rock's death colour ("Red is death!") is black and it sends off opaque beams of blackness, which instantly dehydrate any living matter they touch. (3) The Alphans are initially horrified at the prospect of living on the sterile and polluted Earth as revealed by Doctor Logan and Carla. (4) For "The Dorcons", Butterworth adapted an earlier draft script ("Return of the Dorcons") with many minor differences in plot and dialogue. (5) The leader of the Alphan planetary survey team is a Pioneer Officer named Yuri Salkov (not Jerry Travis). (6) "The Immunity Syndrome" ends with the "I-That-Am-I" entity taking its own life. It could not stand the guilt of its murdering the beings it had encountered regardless of intention. The Alphans then seriously entertain the notion of relocating to the planet and the series ends with on optimistic note. This final installment was never released in the UK and only in a limited distribution in the US.
"The Taybor" is the only Year Two episode not included in this series of novelisations.
Since Michael Butterworth adapted his novelisations primarily from early drafts of Year Two scripts, many of the character names and personalities are considerably different from the later aired versions.

Foreign-language releases
Space: 1999 novels and novelisations were also written in other languages for specific markets, mainly Germany and Italy, where the series was highly popular.

In Italy, adaptations of all 24 Year One episodes and eight of the Year Two episodes were published in oversized hardback volumes. These books typically contained two episodes and nearly 100 colour photos each. Like the Michael Butterworth English-language editions, many of these books were adapted from early drafts of scripts, and events and details sometimes differ significantly from the episodes later aired.

In Germany, the Butterworth Year Two novels were translated into German, with one significant difference. The ending of "The Edge of the Infinite" was altered in order to set up events that would be continued in six original follow-on novels. The first two novels in the series were translated and published in Japan by Mikasa Shobo.
Das Andromeda-Rätsel (literally The Andromeda Riddle) by H.W. Springer (Pseudonym of Hans Wolf Sommer)
Das Erbe der Roboter (literally The Robots' Heritage) by H.W. Springer
Die Ewigen von Luna (literally The Eternals of Luna) by H.W. Springer
Invasion der Esper (literally Invasion of the Espers) by H.W. Springer
Aktion Exodus (analogously Operation Exodus) by Kurt Brand
Der Stahlplanet (literally The Steel Planet) by M.F. Thomas

The final novel, Der Stahlplanet is notable in that it concludes the Space: 1999 odyssey by having the Alphans teleport to Texas City, Earth via the neutrino transmission process introduced in "Journey to Where".

2000s novels and novelisations
In 2002, Fanderson published a new edition of the novel Earthfall  which corrected the typographic errors of the original publication and, with the permission of the author, separated the novel into its three component sections: Part One, "Breakaway" (set in September 1999); Part Two, "Colony Alpha" (January 2000); and Part Three, "Earthfall" (October 2018). Fanderson went on to publish a new original novel, Earthbound, written by E. C. Tubb, in 2003. This book contained an adaptation of "Earthbound", the one episode which was not included in the original novelisation run, as well as adaptations of two scripts of Year Two stories which retained the Year One format in which the scripts had originally been written: "The Exiles" and "The Face of Eden" (or "The Immunity Syndrome"). Also in 2002, Eagle One Media published a new edition of the novel Alien Seed with a new preface by Tubb. The same year, Powys Media launched a new series of officially licensed original novels and related works of non-fiction, and revised and expanded omnibus editions of previously issued novelisations for Year Two. All books are English-language releases, available directly from the companies' websites.

Fanderson releases
Earthfall by E.C. Tubb (original novel).
Earthbound by E.C. Tubb, afterword by Chris Bentley (novelisation).

Eagle One Media releases
Alien Seed by E.C. Tubb, preface by the author (original novel).

Powys Media releases
Resurrection by William Latham, foreword by Johnny Byrne (original novel), 2002. A sequel to "End of Eternity" in the Year One format.
The Forsaken by John Kenneth Muir, foreword by Prentis Hancock (original novel), 2003. Reprinted in a revised edition on January 23, 2013. An original novel placed between Years One and Two. Paul Morrow and Tanya Alexander are written out of the series.
Survival by Brian Ball, foreword by Barry Morse (original novel), 2005. An original novel, placed between Years One and Two, that depicts the fate of Professor Victor Bergman.
Eternity Unbound by William Latham, afterword by the author (original novel), 2005. A Balor trilogy. Part One depicts the events on Progron 1000 years before the present, while Part Two is a script-to-prose adaption of "End of Eternity", and Part Three is a revised reprint of Latham's novel Resurrection.
YEAR TWO by Michael Butterworth, foreword by the author, afterword by Mateo Latosa (novelisation omnibus), 2005. A re-issue of the six Butterworth novelisations published in the 1970s. The stories are now placed in chronological order and have been re-written to conform more to their broadcast versions where necessary. "The Taybor" is finally adapted and inserted into the narrative. New material is introduced to link the stories together and give them some continuity not only with Year One, but also with the range of published (and forthcoming) Powys Space: 1999 novels.
Shepherd Moon by various authors, foreword by Mateo Latosa (an anthology), January 2010.
Born for Adversity by David A. McIntee, foreword and afterword by Catherine Schell (original novel), February 2010. Set in Year Three.
Omega by William Latham, foreword by Christopher Penfold (original novel), March 2010. Set in Year Three.
Alpha by William Latham, afterword by Christopher Penfold (original novel), March 2010. Set in Year Three.
Android Planet by John Rankine, foreword by John Mason (revised reissue of original novel), 3 February 2011. Set in Year One.
Phoenix of Megaron by John Rankine, foreword by John Mason (revised reissue of original novel), September 14, 2012. Set in Year One.
Johnny Byrne's Children of the Gods by William Latham, foreword by Sandy Byrne, afterword by William Latham (original novel), January 23, 2013. Set in Year Three.
The Whispering Sea by John Kenneth Muir, foreword by David Hirsch (original novel), February 2014. Set in Year Two.
The Final Revolution by William Latham, foreword by Barbara Bain (original novel), July 2015. Set in Year Three.
Rogue Planet by E.C. Tubb, foreword by Philip Harbottle (original novel), November 2019, reissued September 2020. Set in Year One.
YEAR ONE (hardcover edition) by Brian Ball, John Rankine and E.C. Tubb, forewords by all three authors, January 2020. A signed and numbered re-issue of the six first season novelizations published in the 1970s. The stories are now placed in chronological order and have been revised to conform more to their broadcast versions where necessary. "Earthbound" has been newly adapted and inserted into the narrative. New material is introduced to link the stories together and give them some continuity not only with Year Two, but with the range of published (and forthcoming) Powys Space: 1999 novels.
Alien Seed by E.C. Tubb, foreword by Philip Harbottle, afterword by David Spencer (original novel), November 2020. Set in Year One.
Earthfall by E.C. Tubb, forewords by Philip Harbottle and Anton Phillips, afterword by Ian Sharpe (original novel), November 2021.
Earthbound by E.C. Tubb, forewords by Philip Harbottle and Patricia T. Sokol, afterword by Christopher Bentley (novelization), October 2022.
YEAR ONE (paperback edition) by Brian Ball, John Rankine and E.C. Tubb, forewords by all three authors, January 2020. A re-issue of the six first season novelizations published in the 1970s. The stories are now placed in chronological order and have been revised to conform more to their broadcast versions where necessary. "Earthbound" has been newly adapted and inserted into the narrative. New material is introduced to link the stories together and give them some continuity not only with Year Two, but also with the range of published (and forthcoming) Powys Space: 1999 novels.

Powys Media commentaries
Chasing the Cyclops (Powys Media. February 2011). William Latham, author of Space: 1999 Omega and its sequel Space: 1999 Alpha, wrote a non-fiction book that detailed the conception, planning, and writing processes that went into the writing of the two novels. It contains a foreword written by Mateo Latosa, the publisher at Powys Media, a small independent publishing company that published officially licensed novels and other works in the Space: 1999 series
Space: 1999 The Powysverse Compendium (Powys Media. February, 2012). Patricia Sokol's detailed analysis of the novels, short stories and audio books in the Space: 1999 series published by Powys Media. It contains a detailed synopsis of each of the works, a timeline and an encyclopedic section of all the persons, places and things in the expanded Space: 1999 universe, meaning the original series and the officially licensed works published by Powys Media. It features a foreword by Zienia Merton (Sandra Benes) and an afterword by Martin Willey.

Non-fiction releases

The Making of Space: 1999
In 1976, Ballantine Books published a paperback behind-the-scenes guide, The Making of Space: 1999, by Tim Heald. It focuses mainly on the early months of production of Year Two. The episode guide for that season is incomplete, since the book was published while Year Two was still airing. It features an extensive photo section with more than 50 black-and-white photos.

The Moonbase Alpha Technical Notebook
In 1977, Starlog magazine published The Moonbase Alpha Technical Notebook. It provides detailed blueprints of Moonbase Alpha, along with illustrations and information on various incarnations of props and costumes. It was intended to be updated on a regular basis, but this idea was abandoned due to low sales. Starlog had released the blueprints of the Eagle Transporter in its seventh issue (dated August 1977) as a possible preview of The Moonbase Alpha Technical Notebook, which was first advertised in the ninth issue. Starlog also released blueprints of the Mark IX Hawk in issue 32 (March 1980), but these were not intended as an update to The Moonbase Alpha Technical Notebook.

Cosmos 1999: L'épopée de la blancheur
By Pierre Fageolle, a socio-cultural analysis of the series, in French.  (DLM Editions, Paris: 1993)

UFO & Space: 1999
By Chris Drake, overview and episode summaries.  (Boxtree, London: 1994)

Exploring Space: 1999
In 1997, McFarland & Company released a non-fiction, scholarly monograph of Space: 1999 by John Kenneth Muir, titled Exploring Space: 1999: an Episode Guide and Complete History of the Mid-1970s Science Fiction Television Series. It was re-released in paperback by McFarland in April 2005.

Destination: Moonbase Alpha
In 2010, Telos Publishing released the most comprehensive non-fiction book published on the subject of Space: 1999. Written by Robert E. Wood and titled Destination: Moonbase Alpha: the Unofficial and Unauthorised Guide to Space: 1999, the book runs to 490 pages and contains a colour photo section featuring model spaceships created for Space: 1999 by special effects technician Martin Bower, as well as a foreword by Zienia Merton (Sandra Benes) and an afterword by Barry Morse (Professor Victor Bergman).

Cosmos 1999: Le fabulaire de l'espace
Didier Liardet's analysis and commentary, in French (Edition Yris, September 2014)

Maya: 1999 - Ovvero: I rovesci della seconda stagione
Agamennone Palinsesti's analysis and commentary on the second season of Space: 1999, in Italian (Sfacelo chimico, 2019)

To Everything That Might Have Been: The Lost Universe Of Space: 1999
Robert E. Wood and David Hirsch present previously unpublished scripts and other material (Telos Publishing, March 2022)

Space: 1999 - The Vault
Coffee table book by Chris Bentley (Signum books, July 2022)

Comic books
In the 1970s, U.S. publisher Charlton Comics released seven issues of a comic based on Space: 1999, as well as eight issues of a black-and-white illustrated magazine featuring more adult-oriented stories. Well-known illustrators on the comics included John Byrne, Joe Staton and Pat Boyette.

In Germany, publisher Koralle Verlag produced 18 adaptations of Year One episodes as part of their Zack colour comic anthologies, one adaptation and four original stories in their Zack Parade line, as well as two full-length graphic novel original adventures in their Zack Box imprint. Many of the episodic adaptations were later translated and reprinted in Italy.

In the UK, a two-page comic strip appeared in Look-In children's magazine from autumn 1975 to spring 1977. Writer Angus Allan had previously contributed to a number of other Gerry Anderson-based strips in the 1960s for TV Century 21 comic. John M. Burns illustrated the first three stories, to be succeeded by Mike Noble when the strip would convert to black-and-white in early 1976. In the autumn of 1976, the strip adopted the Year Two format, with Burns returning for a brief coda story that November. Some of these strips were reprinted in black-and-white as complete compilations in the Portuguese TV Junior comic.

In 2013, a 'rebooted' and elaborated new graphic novel appeared, entitled Aftershock and Awe. In this context, the events of Space 1999 occur in an alternate history. In this timeline, John Fitzgerald Kennedy was never assassinated, and the space race continued apace. In 1987, a Third World War broke out, between the United States and North Korea, causing widespread devastation, but limited harm, given that international expenditure on the space race diminished the intensity of the escalated nuclear arms race in our world's Cold War during the eighties. Ronald Reagan and Kim Jong-Il are forced to resign their presidential offices after the catastrophe. On September 13, 1999, the Moon is blown out of Earth orbit by an intense nuclear accident and into a space warp. The series was expected carry on the narrative into a 'third season,' but as of 2019 the only other publication in this line has been To Everything That Was, an omnibus featuring remastered comic strips from the Charlton and Look-In series.

Audio dramas
In the 1970s, Power Records produced seven child-oriented audio dramas based on Space: 1999, most adapting Year One episodes; this differed from most other Power Records properties licensed from TV series that relied on original stories. "Breakaway", "Death's Other Dominion" and "Mission of the Darians" were released on a single 33 rpm LP, while a second album contains "End of Eternity" and "Dragon's Domain" accompanied by the two original adventures "Return to the Beginning" (in which, after the Moon passes through a violent space storm, the Alphans discover that they have returned to Earth; arriving on the surface, however, Koenig and Company find themselves in Biblical times; they encounter Noah and witness the Flood) and "It Played So Softly on the Ear" (in which a strange tune leads the Alphans to a habitable planet, where solar flares have placed the population in suspended animation; two remaining conscious scientists, who can reverse the process with blood transfusions, abduct the Alphans to serve as donors). In addition, Power Records published individual comic "book-and-record" editions of "Breakaway" and "Return to the Beginning" with 45 rpm vinyl records enclosed.

Powys Media releases
Resurrection, an audiobook by William Latham, read by Barry Morse, 7 May 2010. Omits the foreword from the original publication.
Spider's Web, an audiobook by William Latham, read by Rupert Booth, 8 November 2010.

Big Finish Audio Dramas 
In 2019, Big Finish Productions received the license to create new full-cast audio dramas re-imagining the series, with Mark Bonnar as Commander Koenig and Maria Teresa Creasey as Dr. Russell. The series is written by Nicholas Briggs, and script edited by Jamie Anderson.
 Breakaway was released 13 September 2019. This one-hour drama replays the events of the TV pilot episode.
 A boxset containing Death’s Other Dominion and two new original episodes, The Siren Call and Goldilocks, will be released February 2021.

See also
 List of television series made into books

References

External links

Destination: Moonbase Alpha: the Unofficial and Unauthorised Guide to Space: 1999
The Moonbase Alpha Technical Manual
Catacombs Guide to Space: 1999 Print Merchandising
Catacombs Guide to Space: 1999 Comics
Complete Comic History of the Space: 1999 in Charlton Magazines and Comics
Complete Comic History of Space: 1999 in Look-In Magazine
Mondstation: 1999 – a guide to the German-language Space: 1999 books and comic strips
Powys Media – publisher of new, licensed Space: 1999 novels
Big Finish Productions – publisher of licensed, re-imagined audio dramas

Space: 1999
Space: 1999
Space: 1999
media
Space: 1999